In the Days of Buffalo Bill is a 1922 American silent Western film serial directed by Edward Laemmle. The film, which consisted of 18 episodes, is currently classified as lost.

Cast

 Art Acord as Art Taylor
 Duke R. Lee as Buffalo Bill Cody
 George A. Williams as Calvert Carter
 Jay Morley as Lambert Ashley
 Otto Nelson as Alden Carter
 Pat Harmon as Gaspard
 Jim Corey as Quantrell
 Burton Law as Allen Pinkerton (as Burton C. Law)
 William De Vaull as Edwin M. Stanton (as William P. Devaull)
 Joel Day as Abraham Lincoln
 J. Herbert Frank as Abraham Lincoln
 Clark Comstock as Thomas C. Durant
 Charles Colby as William H. Seward
 Joseph Hazelton as Gideon Welles (as Joe Hazleton)
 John W. Morris as Gen. U. S. Grant
 Lafe McKee as Gen. Robert E. Lee (as Lafayette McKee)
 G.B. Philips as Montgomery Blair
 Tex Driscoll as Gen. U.S. Grant (as John W. Morris)
 Harry Myers as Andrew Johnson (as Henry Myers)
 Ruth Royce as Aimee Lenard
 Chief Lightheart as Sitting Bull
 William Knight as Jack Casement
 Elsie Greeson as Louise Frederici
 Buck Connors as Hank Tabor
 Millard K. Wilson as Tim O'Mara (as M.K. Wilson)
 William F. Moran as John Wilkes Booth (as William Moran)
 Silver Tip Baker as Gen. Grenville M. Dodge (as Silvertip Baker)
 Charles Newton as Maj. North
 Alfred Hollingsworth as Chief Justice Chase
 Lester Cuneo
 Marion Feducha as Andrew Johnson as a boy
 Helen Farnum (uncredited)
 Joe Miller (uncredited)
 Dorothy Wood (uncredited)

Litigation over name "Buffalo Bill"
The corporation founded by William F. Cody, the actual Buffalo Bill, and two partners in 1913, which made a film of his wild west exploits, The Adventures of Buffalo Bill (1917), brought a suit in federal court in Colorado seeking an injunction to prevent the 1922 film serial from using the name "Buffalo Bill" and his likeness in any advertising. Applying the law of unfair competition, the court dismissed the suit noting that the name, which at best had only a common law trademark, had acquired a secondary meaning regarding the American West which had lost its exclusivity from being used in several plays without challenge, and that the theater-going public could readily distinguish between the films.

Chapter titles
 Bonds of Steel
 In the Enemy's Hands
 The Spy
 The Sword of Grant and Lee
 The Man of the Ages
 Prisoners of the Sioux
 Shackles of Fate
 The Last Shot
 From Tailor to President
 Empire Builders
 Perils of the Plains
 The Hand of Justice
 Trails of Peril
 The Scarlet Doom
 Men of Steel
 The Brink of Eternity
 A Race to the Finish
 Driving the Golden Spike

See also 
 List of film serials
 List of film serials by studio
 List of lost films

References 
Notes

Citations

External links 

 
 In the Days of Buffalo Bill at silentera.com
 

1922 films
1922 lost films
1922 Western (genre) films
American black-and-white films
American silent serial films
Films directed by Edward Laemmle
Cultural depictions of Buffalo Bill
Lost Western (genre) films
Lost American films
Cultural depictions of Ulysses S. Grant
Cultural depictions of John Wilkes Booth
Cultural depictions of Sitting Bull
Cultural depictions of Andrew Johnson
Cultural depictions of Robert E. Lee
Cultural depictions of Abraham Lincoln
Silent American Western (genre) films
Universal Pictures film serials
1920s American films